Barry Charles Eddy (born 9 January 1952) is a former Australian rules footballer who played for Geelong in the Victorian Football League (now known as the Australian Football League).

References

External links
 
 
 Barry Eddy's playing statistics from The VFA Project

1952 births
Living people
Geelong Football Club players
Geelong West Football Club players
Australian rules footballers from Victoria (Australia)